Earl of Northumbria or Ealdorman of Northumbria was a title in the late Anglo-Saxon, Anglo-Scandinavian and early Anglo-Norman period in England.  The ealdordom was a successor of the Norse Kingdom of York. In the seventh century, the Anglo-Saxon kingdoms of Bernicia and Deira were united in the kingdom of Northumbria, but this was destroyed by the Vikings in 867. Southern Northumbria, the former Deira, then became the Viking kingdom of York, while the rulers of Bamburgh commanded territory roughly equivalent to the northern kingdom of Bernicia. In 1006 Uhtred the Bold, ruler of Bamburgh, by command of Æthelred the Unready became ealdorman  in the south, temporarily re-uniting much of the area of Northumbria into a single jurisdiction. Uhtred was murdered in 1016, and Cnut then appointed Eric of Hlathir ealdorman at York, but Uhtred's dynasty held onto Bamburgh. After the Norman Conquest the region was divided into multiple smaller baronies, one of which was the earldom of Northumberland, with others like the earldoms of York and numerous autonomous liberties such as the County Palatine of Durham and Liberty of Tynedale.

West Saxon- and Danish-Era ealdormen

Post-Conquest ealdormen

Anglo-Norman-Era baronial title

See also
List of monarchs of Northumbria
Rulers of Bamburgh
Earl of York
Earl of Northumberland

Notes

Earldoms in England before 1066
Anglo-Normans
 
Noble titles created in 1067
Noble titles created in 1068
Noble titles created in 1070
Noble titles created in 1072
Noble titles created in 1075
Noble titles created in 1080
Noble titles created in 1086
Noble titles created in 1139
Noble titles created in 1189
Noble titles created in 1215
Lists of nobility